José Antonio Torrealba Acevedo (born 13 June 1980 in Acarigua) is a retired Venezuelan footballer  who played as a striker.

Club career
Torrealba started his career at Universidad de Los Andes and played for several different local sides. Also, he had two spells in South Africa.

International career
Torrealba has made 17 appearances for the Venezuela national football team. He made his debut in a friendly match against Ecuador on August 17, 2005. He was also a participant at the 2007 Copa America.

Torrealba has played 17 games for the Venezuela national team, scoring four goals.

International goals

|- 
| 1. || August 17, 2005 || Federativo Reina del Cisne, Loja, Ecuador ||  || 2–1 || 3–1 || Friendly
|- 
| 2. || September 3, 2005 || José Pachencho Romero, Maracaibo, Venezuela ||  || 3–1 || 4–1 || 2006 FIFA World Cup qualification
|-
| 3. || September 3, 2005 || José Pachencho Romero, Maracaibo, Venezuela ||  || 4–1 || 4–1 || 2006 FIFA World Cup qualification
|-
| 4. || March 24, 2007 || Metropolitano de Mérida, Mérida, Venezuela ||  || 2–0 || 3–1 || Friendly
|}

References

1980 births
Living people
Association football forwards
Venezuelan footballers
Venezuela international footballers
2007 Copa América players
Estudiantes de Mérida players
Deportivo Táchira F.C. players
UA Maracaibo players
Mamelodi Sundowns F.C. players
Kaizer Chiefs F.C. players
A.C.C.D. Mineros de Guayana players
Carabobo F.C. players
Asociación Civil Deportivo Lara players
Venezuelan expatriate footballers
Expatriate soccer players in South Africa
Venezuelan expatriate sportspeople in South Africa
People from Acarigua